This is a list of the National Register of Historic Places listings in Midland County, Texas.

This is intended to be a complete list of properties and districts listed on the National Register of Historic Places in Midland County, Texas. There are five properties listed on the National Register in the county including two that are Recorded Texas Historic Landmarks.

Current listings

The locations of National Register properties may be seen in a mapping service provided.

|}

See also

National Register of Historic Places listings in Texas
Recorded Texas Historic Landmarks in Midland County

References

External links

Midland County, Texas
Midland County
Buildings and structures in Midland County, Texas